Theophilus Oladipo Ogunlesi (12 July 1923 – 19 January 2023) was the first Nigerian professor of medicine. He was the pioneer head of University College Hospital, Ibadan and the National Postgraduate Medical College of Nigeria.

Early life and education 
Ogunlesi was born on 12 July 1923 to a blacksmith father in Sagamu, Ogun State. Between 1931-35, he attended St. Paul Primary School in Sagamu and obtained his secondary school certificate at CMS Grammar School in Lagos in 1940. He obtained his post-secondary school certificate from Higher College in Yaba in 1942. Ogunlesi began his journey in the medical profession in 1947 through the Yaba Medical School and later attended the University of London in 1953 where he eventually qualified as a medical officer in Britain.

Career 
Ogunlesi began his career in Nigeria as a specialist in the Western State Civil Service. He was a medical officer of the Western Nigeria Civil Service (WNC) from 1950-56. He joined the University of Ibadan in 1961 and became a professor four years later. He was the first Nigerian lecturer of medicine and also became the first Nigerian professor of medicine. During his teaching career he taught such notable people as former Vice-chancellor of the University of Ibadan, Professor Isaac Folorunso Adewole, a founding member of Pan African Association of Neurological Sciences, Professor Kayode Oshuntokun, and the late Professor Yombo Awojobi, who was a distinguished surgeon. He retired in 1983 at age 60.

Fellowship and membership 
In 1977 he was inducted as a fellow into the Nigerian Academy of Sciences.

Personal life 
Ogunlesi married Susan Olorunfemi Peters in 1950. They had seven children including Adebayo Ogunlesi, a member of Donald Trump's economic team.

Death 
Ogunlesi died on 19 January 2023, at the age of 99. The Ogun State governor Dapo Abiodun remarked: The president of Nigeria, Muhammadu Buhari also stated:

References 

1923 births
2023 deaths
Nigerian academics
Nigerian academic administrators
Nigerian medical doctors
People from Sagamu